Football Club Goa (women) is a women's football club affiliated with FC Goa. The team currently plays in the GFA Vedanta Women's Football League, the state division of women's football in Goa.

Formed in 2018, the F.C. Goa Women's team played its inaugural season in the second edition of GFA Vedanta Women's League.

History

Inception
FC Goa women's team is officially launched on 28 July 2018 became the second Indian Super League (ISL) side, after FC Pune City, to launch a women's team. 

The women's side of the Goan Club was launched ahead of the second Vedanta Goa Women's Football League.

"The women's team will be built in the same image and with the same principles as the men's team. The club will work extremely hard towards developing and producing talented women footballers and hope to emulate the successful women that represented the national team from Goa in the 1970's," FC Goa Technical Director Derrick Pereira said on the official launching ceremony.

Stadium

The Pandit Jawaharlal Nehru Stadium in Margao, better known as The Fatorda is the home stadium of Goa. The stadium has hosted many international games, including India national team's qualifiers for both the FIFA World Cup and AFC Asian Cup. It was also one of the six host venues for the 2017 FIFA U-17 World Cup held in India.

The stadium opened in 1989. In 2014, it has been refurbished and upgraded according to the latest FIFA specifications to host the Lusofonia Games in 2014. It is designed with a 20,000 seating capacity With a roof covering 100 percent of the seating area, the stadium complex provides two levels of fans seating arrangement along with a VIP area.

Players

Records

Honours 
 GFA Vedanta Women's League
 Runners-up (1): 2021

References

FC Goa
Football clubs in Goa
Women's football clubs in India
Association football clubs established in 2018
2018 establishments in Goa